Luigi Bernini (1612, Rome - 22 December 1681, Rome) was an Italian engineer, architect, and sculptor.

Life
The son of Pietro Bernini and his wife Angelica Galante, he was born after the couple moved to Rome in 1605. He trained in his elder brother Gian Lorenzo's workshop and assisted him on several works such as the Baldacchino of St Peter's and the 1626 angel for the high altar in Sant'Agostino in Campo Marzio.

Works 
Bernini designed the 7-hectare gardens of Valsanzibio, where visitors to the garden arrived by gondola to a doorway of sculptures within sculptures within sculptures.

References 

Gian Lorenzo Bernini
17th-century Italian sculptors
17th-century Italian architects
Engineers from Rome
Architects from Rome
1612 births
1681 deaths
Burials at Santa Maria Maggiore
Pupils of Gian Lorenzo Bernini